is part of the Ishikari Mountains, Hokkaidō, Japan. On its slopes are the head waters of the Ishikari River.

See also 
 Central Ishikari Mountains
 Daisetsuzan National Park

References 
 Hokkaido, Seamless Digital Geographical Map of Japan, Geological Survey of Japan, AIST (ed.). 2007.

Ishikari